Dolichoderus punctatus is an extinct species of Eocene ant in the genus Dolichoderus. Described by Dlussky in 2008, fossils of the species were found in the Baltic Amber.

References

†
Eocene insects
Prehistoric insects of Europe
Fossil taxa described in 2008
Fossil ant taxa